This is a list of fictional dogs in animated television and is a subsidiary to the list of fictional dogs. It is a collection of various animated dogs in television.

References

Lists of fictional canines
Fictional dogs